The Superintendency of Residential Public Services (SSP) is a regulatory agency of the government of Colombia in charge of regulating and overseeing public utility service providers.

See also
 Potable Water and Basic Sanitation Regulation Commission

References

Water supply and sanitation in Colombia
Government agencies established in 1994
National Planning Department (Colombia)
1994 establishments in Colombia